Colonel Frederick William Mackenzie Spring (16 October 1841 – 1925) was a British Army officer and military historian.

Spring was born in Bombay, India in 1841, the son of Frederick James Spring and Jane Balfour Mackenzie. He was commissioned into the Bombay Artillery in 1865, which later amalgamated with the Royal Regiment of Artillery. He served in the British Expedition to Abyssinia from 1867 to 1868. In 1870, he was promoted to second captain, and two years later was elevated to the rank of full captain. He became a major in 1878. On 18 June 1884, he was promoted to lieutenant-colonel. He saw service in the Third Anglo-Burmese War and was Inspector General of Ordnance in Bombay between 1886 and 1893. Spring was promoted to colonel on 18 June 1888. After leaving service in 1894, Spring was invested as a Companion of the Order of the Bath. He wrote a book regarding the officers of the Bengal Army and the Royal Artillery, and contributed to several other military history publications. In retirement he lived in Midhurst, West Sussex.

In 1877, Spring married Ellen Harriett, daughter of Surgeon-General James Gordon Inglis, CB. Their son, Frederick, became a brigadier-general and served in the First World War.

Publications
The Bombay Artillery: List of Officers who have served in the Regiment of Bombay Artillery from its Formation in 1749 to Amalgamation with the Royal Artillery (1902)

References

1841 births
Frederick
Bombay Artillery officers
Royal Artillery officers
British Indian Army officers
1925 deaths
Companions of the Order of the Bath